Marketplace ministry typically refers to evangelism or other Christian activities that are targeted towards the secular workplace, as opposed to homes, churches, or specialized venues. It can also refer to particular parachurch organizations that focus on such ministry.

While the original use of the term is primarily evangelical in nature, transformationalism uses many of the same structures, often under the term marketplace redemption.

See also
Transformationalism

Christian missions